"Cry Baby" is a song by American singer-songwriter Melanie Martinez from her debut studio album of the same name (2015). The song's music video was released on March 14, 2016.

Background and composition
"Cry Baby" runs for three minutes and fifty-nine seconds. The alt-pop song opens the album, creating a "spooky" atmosphere with minimalist electronic sounds and whispered lyrics.

The song is positioned in the key of F minor and runs at a tempo of 95 BPM. Although it was composed in said key, a chord progression isn't followed.

Certifications

Notes

References

2015 songs
Melanie Martinez songs
Songs written by Melanie Martinez
Songs written by One Love (record producer)
Songs written by Kinetics (rapper)

Songs about childhood
Songs about loneliness